World News may refer to one of the following sources that covers international news:

 ABC World News Tonight, a television news program that airs on American television network ABC
 BBC World News, the international news and current affairs television channel of the BBC
 CNN World News, a television news program that airs on CNN International
 ITN World News, a television news program that originated in the United Kingdom, and aired during the late-eighties and most of the nineties
 SBS World News, a television news program that airs on the Australian network SBS
 Sky World News, a television news program that airs on Sky News
 World News by Don Lee Broadcasting, on W6XAO (now KCBS-TV; 1938–1948)
 World News Now, an overnight news program that airs on American television network ABC
 World News Network, an internet news aggregation service
 World Magazine

See also
World news